The discography of albums and singles released by American country music artist Vince Gill comprises 18 studio albums, 16 compilation albums and one extended play. Between 1985 and 2017, Gill has charted 67 songs on the Billboard Hot Country Songs chart, including seven that reached number one.

Studio albums

1980s and 1990s

2000s and 2010s

Compilation albums

1980s and 1990s

2000s and 2010s

Extended plays

Singles

1980s

1990s

2000s and 2010s

As a featured artist

Other charted songs

Music videos

Guest appearances

See also
Pure Prairie League
The Notorious Cherry Bombs

Notes

References

Country music discographies
Discographies of American artists